Central States Wrestling was a professional wrestling promotion based in Kansas City, Missouri from 1948 to 1988. Former employees in NWA Central States consisted of professional wrestlers, managers, play-by-play and color commentators, announcers, interviewers and referees.

Male wrestlers

Female wrestlers

Midget wrestlers

Stables and tag teams

Managers and valets

Commentators and interviewers

Other personnel

References 

General
 
 
 
 
 

Specific

External links 
 NWA Central States alumni at Cagematch.net
 NWA Central States alumni at OWW.com
 NWA Central States alumni at Wrestlingdata.com

NWA Central States alumni